Kisumimi-no-mikoto is a character in Japanese mythology, a male deity and the son of the first Emperor Jimmu. He is the younger brother of Tagishimimi and some speculate they were the same person.

References in the Kiki 
The Nihon Shoki simple describes him and Tagishimimi as being born to Ahiratsu-hime and Emperor Jimmu. without further mention

Genealogy

Footnotes

Notes

Sources

Bibliographic information 

 "Dictionary of Japanese Divine Names", Jinja-Shimpo-Sha, 1994, 1995 (2nd edition), ISBN 4-915265-66-8
 "Dictionary of Japan's Ancient Shinto Gods", Kazunori Yoshida/editor, Chunichi Press, 2000, ISBN 4-88519-158-0
 "Dictionary of Japanese Gods and Buddha", Takehiko Oshima, Minoru Sonoda, Fumio Keimuro, Setsu Yamamoto (eds.), Taishukan Shoten, 2001, ISBN 4-469-01268-8
 "Nihon no Kami Yomiwake Jiten" (An Encyclopedia of Japanese Gods), Kenji Kawaguchi/editor, Kashiwa Shobo, 1999, 2009 (9th printing), ISBN 4-7601-1824-1
 "Kojiki to Nihon no Kami ga Kunderu Hon" (The Book of Ancient Matters and Understanding Japanese Gods), Kunihiro Yoshida, Gakken Publishing, 2015, ISBN 978-4-05-406340-2
 "Illustrated Chronicle of the Rekiyo Emperors", Edited by Masao Mitobe, Kazuo Higo, Shizuko Akagi, Shigetaka Fukuchi, Akita Shoten, 1989, ISBN 4-253-00297-8
 "A Genealogical Directory of the Empresses of the Rekishi Era" (Bessatsu Rekishi Yomihon 24, Vol. 27, No. 29, 618), edited by Minoru Sato, Shinninjin Oraisha, 2002
 "The History of Hyuga Province: An Ancient History" by Sadakichi Kida, Toyo-do, 1943

Japanese deities
Japanese mythology